The Emet mine is a large boron ore mine located at Kütahya Province in western Turkey. Emet represents one of the largest boron reserves in Turkey having an estimated reserve of 1.68 billion tonnes of ore grading 28% boron.

References 

Boron mines in Turkey
Kütahya Province